Cura personalis is a Latin phrase that translates as "care for the entire person."  suggests individualized attention to the needs of the other.

The expression is a hallmark of Ignatian spirituality that is commonly used by the Catholic Church religious order, the Society of Jesus. Originally used to describe the responsibility of the Jesuit superior to care for each man in the community with his unique gifts, challenges, needs and possibilities, this value now is applied more broadly to include the relationship between educators and students and professional relationships among all those who work in the academic (usually university) environment, generally of Roman Catholic educational institutions. The phrase is also a motto of a number of Jesuit colleges and universities.

References

Latin mottos
Latin religious words and phrases
Society of Jesus
Catholic terminology